Niță Mircea Cireașă (born 21 January 1965) is a Romanian former footballer who played as a midfielder.

International career
Niță Cireașă played one friendly game at international level for Romania, when coach Mircea Lucescu sent him on the field in order to replace Ioan Andone in the 75th minute of a 3–0 loss against Scotland.

Honours
Steaua București
Divizia A: 1986–87, 1987–88, 1988–89
Cupa României: 1986–87, 1988–89

References

1965 births
Living people
Romanian footballers
Romania international footballers
Association football midfielders
Liga I players
Liga II players
Challenger Pro League players
AFC Dacia Unirea Brăila players
Chimia Râmnicu Vâlcea players
FC Steaua București players
FC Olt Scornicești players
K.F.C. Verbroedering Geel players
Romanian expatriate footballers
Expatriate footballers in Belgium
Romanian expatriate sportspeople in Belgium
Sportspeople from Brăila